In refrigeration system the high-pressure cut-off switch is a control device which is used as safety control. The compressor is stopped by cutting the power supply of the motor of the compressor whenever the discharge pressure of the compressor becomes excessive. This is necessary to prevent the possible damage of equipment.

When the pressure in discharge line raise above a certain limit of pressure, high-pressure control device operates and stops the compressor by cutting the power supply given to the motor input.

Heating, ventilation, and air conditioning